Bunk Henderson was an American Negro league catcher in the 1920s.

Henderson played for the Birmingham Black Barons in 1925. In five recorded games, he posted one hit in 12 plate appearances.

References

External links
 and Seamheads

Year of birth missing
Year of death missing
Place of birth missing
Place of death missing
Birmingham Black Barons players
Baseball catchers